Daniel Zampieri (born 22 May 1990, in Rome) is an Italian racing driver.

Career

Formula Renault
After a two-year international karting career, Zampieri moved up to Formula Renault with BVM Racing in 2006. Making his debut in Italian Formula Renault at Spa–Francorchamps, Zampieri finished 17th and 18th on début. His best finish of the championship came at another Formula One venue, Hockenheim, when he finished eleventh in the opening race. He also took part in six Eurocup races for BVM, again with a best finish of eleventh in Barcelona. To gain more Formula Renault experience, Zampieri committed to a campaign in the Italian Formula Renault Winter Series. He finished the championship in ninth place, tied on fifty points with Nicola de Marco.

Zampieri moved to Cram Competition for the 2007 season, competing in the European and Italian series once again. Zampieri broke into the top ten of a Eurocup race for the first time, finishing tenth at Magny–Cours, giving him a final championship placing of 22nd, tied on points with Jules Bianchi. He added consistent finishes in the Italian series, ending up with three top tens, including a sixth at Spa, and finished fifteenth overall in the championship. He returned for another shot at the Winter Series title, and finished as runner–up (edging out Fabio Onidi on a tie–break) behind César Ramos, who recorded a perfect score for the four–race series.

He returned to BVM for the 2008 season; his third season in each category, teaming up with his rival from the Winter Series, Ramos and British driver Adrian Quaife-Hobbs. In the Eurocup, Zampieri again recorded his best results in Belgium, at Spa. A fourth place in race one was followed by his first (and ultimately, only) podium with third in the second race. After Spa, he scored only one more point as he tailed off to tenth in the championship. He finished one place higher in the Italian standings, but again failed to win a race, with a best result of second coming at the opening race at Vallelunga.

Formula Three
Zampieri moved up to Formula Three in 2009, staying with BVM for a campaign in the Italian Formula Three Championship. Zampieri won the championship by fifteen points from Marco Zipoli. He won four races, got five poles and set three fastest laps over the course of the season. He also competed in the non–championship Masters of Formula 3 event at Zandvoort, finishing 21st.

GP2 Series
Zampieri raced in the 2009–10 season of the GP2 Asia Series for the Rapax Team, who took over his original Piquet GP team after the first round of the season.

Formula Renault 3.5 Series

Zampieri graduated to the Formula Renault 3.5 Series for the 2010 season, partnering Federico Leo at Pons Racing. He finished the season in ninth place after securing podium places at both Motorland Aragón and Spa–Francorchamps. His season, however, was not without incident. He was disqualified from the second races at both Hockenheim and Barcelona and banned from starting the opening race at Silverstone after an altercation with ISR Racing team boss Igor Salaquarda after Zampieri felt that their driver Filip Salaquarda had blocked him during qualifying.

After testing extensively for the team during the off–season, Zampieri joined new team BVM–Target for the 2011 season, racing alongside Sergio Canamasas.

Racing record

Career summary

† As Zampieri was a guest driver, he was ineligible to score points.

Complete GP2 Series results

Complete GP2 Asia Series results
(key) (Races in bold indicate pole position) (Races in italics indicate fastest lap)

Complete Formula Renault 3.5 Series results
(key) (Races in bold indicate pole position) (Races in italics indicate fastest lap)

Complete European Le Mans Series results

Complete Blancpain GT Series Sprint Cup results

References

External links

 
 
 

1990 births
Living people
Racing drivers from Rome
Italian racing drivers
Italian Formula Three Championship drivers
Italian Formula Renault 2.0 drivers
Formula Renault Eurocup drivers
GP2 Asia Series drivers
World Series Formula V8 3.5 drivers
Blancpain Endurance Series drivers
International GT Open drivers
European Le Mans Series drivers
24 Hours of Spa drivers
ADAC GT Masters drivers
24H Series drivers
BVM Target drivers
Cram Competition drivers
Prema Powerteam drivers
Rapax Team drivers
Piquet GP drivers
SMP Racing drivers
AF Corse drivers
Pons Racing drivers
Lamborghini Super Trofeo drivers